Acinia picturata, the sourbush seed fly, is a species of fruit fly in the family Tephritidae.

Description
United States, Guatemala, West Indies. Introduced Hawaii, Johnston Atoll, Wake Island.

References

Tephritinae
Diptera of North America
Insects described in 1894